The system of local government Ireland, then wholly within the United Kingdom of Great Britain and Ireland, was reformed by the Local Government (Ireland) Act 1898, which came into force in 1899. The new system divided Ireland into the following entities:

At the county level:
Administrative counties; and
County boroughs

Within the administrative counties:
Municipal boroughs, governed by the Municipal Corporations (Ireland) Act 1840;
Urban districts; and
Rural districts

Some counties contained rural districts only, with no municipal boroughs or urban districts.

A number of small towns located in rural districts also had town commissioners with limited powers under the Towns Improvement (Ireland) Act 1854.

County boroughs

County Antrim

County Armagh

County Carlow

County Cavan

County Clare

County Cork

County Donegal

County Down

County Dublin

County Fermanagh

County Galway

County Kerry

County Kildare

County Kilkenny

King's County

County Leitrim

County Limerick

County Londonderry

County Longford

County Louth

County Mayo

County Meath

County Monaghan

Queen's County

County Roscommon

County Sligo

Tipperary (North Riding)

Tipperary (South Riding)

County Tyrone

County Waterford

County Westmeath

County Wexford

County Wicklow

See also
 List of rural and urban districts in Northern Ireland (1921—1972)

Sources

Citations

History of local government in Ireland
History of local government in the United Kingdom
History of Ireland (1801–1923)
Local government
Ireland history-related lists